The Codex Vaticanus (The Vatican, Bibl. Vat., Vat. gr. 1209), designated by siglum B or 03 (in the Gregory-Aland numbering), δ 1 (von Soden), is a fourth-century Christian manuscript of a Greek Bible, containing the majority of the Greek Old Testament and the majority of the Greek New Testament. It is one of the four great uncial codices. Along with Codex Alexandrinus and Codex Sinaiticus, it is one of the earliest and most complete manuscripts of the Bible. The codex has been dated palaeographically to the 4th century.

The manuscript became known to Western scholars as a result of correspondence between Erasmus and the prefects of the Vatican Library. Portions of the codex were collated by several scholars, but numerous errors were made during this process. The codex's relationship to the Latin Vulgate was unclear and scholars were initially unaware of its value. This changed in the 19th century when transcriptions of the full codex were completed. It was at that point that scholars realised the text differed significantly from the Textus Receptus.

Most current scholars consider Codex Vaticanus to be one of the most important Greek witnesses to the Greek text of the New Testament, followed by Codex Sinaiticus. Until the discovery by Tischendorf of Sinaiticus, Vaticanus was unrivalled. It was extensively used by Westcott and Hort in their edition of The New Testament in the Original Greek in 1881. The most widely sold editions of the Greek New Testament are largely based on the text of the Codex Vaticanus. Codex Vaticanus "is rightly considered to be the oldest extant copy of the Bible."

The Codex is named after its place of conservation in the Vatican Library, where it has been kept since at least the 15th century.

Description 

The manuscript is in quarto volume, written on 759 leaves of fine and thin vellum (sized , although originally bigger), in uncial letters, arranged in quires of five sheets or ten leaves each, similar to Codex Marchalianus or Codex Rossanensis; but unlike Codex Sinaiticus which has an arrangement of four or three sheets. The number of the quires is often found in the margin. Originally it must have been composed of 830 parchment leaves, but it appears that 71 leaves have been lost. The Old Testament currently consists of 617 sheets and the New Testament of 142 sheets. The codex is written in three columns per page, with 40–44 lines per page, and 16–18 letters per line. In the poetical books of the Old Testament (OT) there are only two columns to a page. There are 44 lines in a column in the Pentateuch, Joshua, Judges, Ruth, and 1 Kings 1:1–19:11; in 2 Chronicles 10:16–26:13 there are 40 lines in a column; and in the New Testament always 42.
The manuscript is one of the very few New Testament manuscripts to be written with three columns per page. The other two Greek codices written in that way are Uncial 048 and Uncial 053.

The Greek lettering in the Codex is written continuously in small and neat letters. All the letters are equidistant from each other; no word is separated from the other, with each line appearing to be one long word. Punctuation is rare (accents and breathings have been added by a later hand) except for some blank spaces, diaeresis on initial iotas and upsilons, abbreviations of the nomina sacra and markings of OT citations. The first letter of a new chapter sometimes protrudes a little from the column. The OT citations were marked by an inverted comma or diplai (>). There are no enlarged initials; no stops or accents; no divisions into chapters or sections such as are found in later manuscripts.

The text of the Gospels is not divided according to the Ammonian Sections with references to the Eusebian Canons, but is divided into peculiar numbered sections: Matthew has 170, Mark 61, Luke 152, and John 80. This system is only found in two other manuscripts: Codex Zacynthius and Minuscule 579. There are two system divisions in the Acts and the Catholic Epistles which differ from the Euthalian Apparatus. In Acts, these sections are 36 (the same system as Codex Sinaiticus, Codex Amiatinus, and Codex Fuldensis) and according to the other system 69 sections. The chapters in the Pauline epistles are numbered continuously as the Epistles were regarded as comprising one book.

Text

Text-type 
In the Old Testament the type of text varies, with a received text in Ezekiel and a rejected one in the Book of Isaiah. In Judges the text differs substantially from that of the majority of manuscripts, but agrees with the Old Latin, Sahidic version and Cyril of Alexandria. In Job, it has the additional 400 half-verses from Theodotion, which are not in the Old Latin and Sahidic versions. The text of the Old Testament was considered by critics, such as Hort and Cornill, to be substantially that which underlies Origen's Hexapla edition, completed by him at Caesarea and issued as an independent work (apart from the other versions with which Origen associated it) by Eusebius and Pamphilus.

In the New Testament the Greek text of the codex is a representative of the Alexandrian text-type. Aland placed it in Category I. It has been found to agree very closely with the text of Bodmer  in the Gospels of Luke and John.  has been dated to the beginning of the 3rd century, and hence is at least 100 years older than the Codex Vaticanus itself. This is purported to demonstrate (by recourse to a postulated earlier exemplar from which both  and B descend) that Vaticanus accurately reproduces an earlier text from these two biblical books, which reinforces the reputation the codex held amongst Biblical scholars. It also strongly suggests that it may have been copied in Egypt. In the Pauline epistles there is a distinctly Western element.

Contents 

The codex originally contained a virtually complete copy of the Septuagint ("LXX"), lacking only 1-4 Maccabees and the Prayer of Manasseh. The original 20 leaves containing Genesis 1:1–46:28a (31 leaves) and Psalm 105:27–137:6b have been lost. These were replaced by pages transcribed by a later hand in the 15th century.
2 Kings 2:5–7, 10-13 are also lost because of a tear to one of the pages. The order of the Old Testament books in the Codex is as follows: Genesis to 2 Chronicles as normal; 1 Esdras; 2 Esdras (Ezra–Nehemiah); the Psalms; Proverbs; Ecclesiastes; Song of Songs; Job; Wisdom; Ecclesiasticus; Esther; Judith; Tobit; the minor prophets from Hosea to Malachi; Isaiah; Jeremiah; Baruch; Lamentations and the Epistle of Jeremiah; Ezekiel and Daniel. This order differs from that followed in Codex Alexandrinus.

The extant New Testament portion contains the Gospels, Acts, the general epistles, the Pauline epistles, and the Epistle to the Hebrews (up to Hebrews 9:14, καθα[ριει); it is lacking 1 and 2 Timothy, Titus, Philemon, and Revelation. The missing part of Hebrews and Revelation were supplemented by a 15th-century minuscule hand (folios 760–768), and are catalogued separately as minuscule 1957. It is possible some apocryphal books from the New Testament were included at the end (as in codices Sinaiticus and Alexandrinus). It is also possible that Revelation was not included.

None-included verses
The text of the New Testament lacks several passages:
Matthew 12:47
Matthew 16:2b–3

Mark 16:9–20 — The Book of Mark ends with verse 16:8.

 (Christ's agony at Gethsemane)

 (Pericope Adulterae)

{

 Phrases not in Vaticanus but in later manuscripts include
Matthew 5:44
 (bless those who curse you, do good to those who hate you)
omit - B  ƒ k sy sa bo mae
incl. - Majority of manuscripts

Matthew 10:37
 (and he who loves son or daughter more than me is not worthy of me)
omit - B* D
incl. - B Majority of manuscripts

 (or (his) mother)
omit - B  D a e sy sa
incl. - Majority of manuscripts

 (and be baptised with the baptism that I am baptised with)
omit - B  D L Z Θ 085 ƒ ƒ it sy sy sa
incl. - Majority of manuscripts

 (and be joined to his wife)
omit - Sinaiticus Ψ 892 ℓ 48 syr go
incl. - Majority of manuscripts

omit - B* K W Δ Ψ ƒ ƒ 28 579 700 1010 1079 1242 1546 2148 ℓ 10 ℓ 950 ℓ 1642 ℓ 1761 sy arm geo
incl. - B Majority of manuscripts

 (and He said: "You do not know what manner of spirit you are of; for the Son of man came not to destroy men's lives but to save them)
omit - B  C L Θ Ξ 33 700 892 1241 syr bo
incl. - Majority of manuscripts

 (but deliver us from evil)
omit - B   L ƒ 700 vg sy sa bo arm geo
incl. - Majority of manuscripts

 (And Jesus said: Father forgive them, they know not what they do.)
omit - B   D* W Θ 0124 1241 a d syr sa bo
incl. - Majority of manuscripts

Additions 
Gospel of 
 (and another took a spear, piercing His side, and out came water and blood - see )
incl. - B  C L Γ 1010 1293 vg
omit - Majority of manuscripts

Notable readings 
 
 (son of Manasse) - B
 (son of Mose) - A

  (9:22 LXX)
 - B
 - A

 Matthew 5:22
 (without cause)
omit - B   vg eth
incl. - Majority of manuscripts

 
 (the third day) - B (singular reading)
 (the third day) - Majority of manuscripts

 
 (the last) - B (singular reading)
 (the last) - D Θ ƒ 700 it
 (the first) - Majority of manuscripts

 
 (desert)
omit - B L ff2 sy sa bo
incl. - Majority of manuscripts

 
 (and opened the book) - B A L W Ξ 33 892 1195 1241 ℓ 547 syr sa bo
 (and unrolled the book) -  D K Δ Θ Π Ψ ƒ ƒ 28 565 700 1009 1010 Majority of manuscripts

 
 (not lawful) - B  Codex Nitriensis 700 lat sa bo arm geo
 (not lawful to do) - Majority of manuscripts

 
 (few things are needfull, or only one) - B (singular reading; but see below)
 (few things are needfull, or only one) -   C L 070 ƒ 33 sy bo
 (one thing is needfull) -   Majority of manuscripts

 
 (glorify my name) - B (singular reading)
 (glorify Your Son)- L X ƒ ƒ 33 1241 vg sy bo
 (glorify Your name) - Majority of manuscripts

 
 (the Father) - B  C* D L ℓ 844 bo
 (God) - C W Ψ ƒ ƒ Majority of manuscripts

 
 (name of island) - B   1175 lat vg sy
 (name of island) - * A 33 81 614 945 1505 1739 vg sy
 (name of island) - Majority of manuscripts

 
 - B D G
 - Majority of manuscripts

 
 (sins) - B (singular reading)
 (desires) - Majority of manuscripts

 
 (revealing) - B (singular reading)
 (upholding) - Majority of manuscripts

History

Provenance 
The provenance and early history of the codex are uncertain; Rome (Hort), southern Italy, Alexandria (Kenyon,), and Caesarea (T. C. Skeat; Burkitt) have been suggested as possible origins. A second argument was the chapter division in Acts, similar to the ones in Sinaiticus and Vaticanus, is not found in any other Greek manuscript, but is present in several manuscripts of the Latin Vulgate. Robinson cautiously suggests however, the system of chapter divisions was introduced into the Vulgate by Jerome himself, due to his studies at Caesarea. Hort also postulated the codex was copied from a manuscript whose line length was 12–14 letters per line, as when the codex's scribe made large omissions, they were typically 12–14 letters long.

Kenyon suggested the manuscript originated in Alexandria: "It is noteworthy that the section numeration of the Pauline Epistles in B shows that it was copied from a manuscript in which the Epistle to the Hebrews was placed between Galatians and Ephesians — an arrangement which elsewhere occurs only in the Sahidic version." Kenyon also suggested the order of the Pauline epistles indicates a connection with Egypt, and as in Codex Alexandrinus, the titles of some of the books contain letters of a distinctively Coptic character, particularly the Coptic mu (which was also frequently seen at the ends of lines where space has to be economized). According to Metzger, "the similarity of its text in significant portions of both Testaments with the Coptic versions and with Greek papyri, and the style of writing (notably the Coptic forms used in some of the titles) point rather to Egypt and Alexandria".

It has been postulated the codex was at one time in the possession of Cardinal Bessarion, because the minuscule supplement has a text similar to one of Bessarion's manuscripts. T. C. Skeat believed Bessarion's mentor, the patriarchal notary in Constantinople John Chortasmenos, had the book brought to Rome from Constantinople around the time of the fall of the Byzantine Empire. Paul Canart argued the decorative initials added to the manuscript in the Middle Ages are reminiscent of Constantinopolitan decoration found in the 10th century, but the poor execution gives the impression they were added in the 11th or 12th century, and likely not before the 12th century in light of the way they appear in connection with notes in a minuscule hand at the beginning of the book of Daniel. T. C. Skeat first argued that Codex Vaticanus was among the 50 Bibles that the Emperor Constantine I ordered Eusebius of Caesarea to produce.

The codex is dated to the first half of the 4th century and is likely slightly older than Codex Sinaiticus, which was also transcribed in the 4th century. One argument to support this is Codex Sinaiticus has the, at that time, very new Eusebian Canon tables, but Vaticanus does not. Another is the slightly more archaic style of Vaticanus, and the complete absence of ornamentation.

Scribes and correctors 

According to Tischendorf the manuscript was written by three scribes (A, B, C), two of whom appear to have written the Old Testament and one the entire New Testament. Tischendorf's view was accepted by Frederic G. Kenyon, but contested by T. C. Skeat, who examined the codex more thoroughly. Skeat and other paleographers contested Tischendorf's theory of a third (C) scribe, instead asserting two scribes worked on the Old Testament (A and B) and one of them (B) wrote the New Testament.

Scribe A wrote:
 Genesis – 1 Kings (pages 41–334)
 Psalms – Tobias (pages 625–944)
Scribe B wrote:
 1 Kings – 2 Esdra (pages 335–624)
 Hosea – Daniel (pages 945–1234)
 New Testament.

Two correctors have been suggested as working on the manuscript, one (B) was contemporary with the scribes, the other (B) worked in about the 10th or 11th century. The theory of a first corrector, B, proposed by Tischendorf was rejected by later scholars. According to Tischendorf, one of the scribes is identical to (and may have been) one of the scribes of Codex Sinaiticus (scribe D), but there is insufficient evidence for his assertion. Skeat agreed that the writing style is very similar to that of Codex Sinaiticus, but there is not enough evidence to accept the scribes were identical: "the identity of the scribal tradition stands beyond dispute".

The original writing was retraced by a later scribe (usually dated to the 10th or 11th century), and the beauty of the original script was spoiled. Accents, breathing marks, and punctuation were added by a later hand. There are no enlarged initials, no divisions into chapters or sections such as are found in later manuscripts, but a different system of division peculiar to this manuscript. There are plenty itacistic faults, especially the interchange of ει for ι and αι for ε. The exchange of ο for ω is less frequent.

The manuscript contains unusual small horizontally aligned double dots (so called "distigmai", formerly called "umlauts") in the column margins and are scattered throughout the New Testament. There are 795 of these clearly seen in the text, and perhaps another 40 that are undetermined. The date of these markings are disputed among scholars. Two such distigmai can be seen in the left margin of the first column (top image). Tischendorf reflected upon their meaning, but without any resolution. He pointed on several places where these distigmai were used: at the ending of the Gospel of Mark, 1 Thess 2:14; 5:28; Heb 4:16; 8:1. The meaning of these distigmai was recognized in 1995 by Philip Payne. Payne discovered the first distigme while studying the section 1 Cor 14.34–35 of the codex. He suggested that distigmai indicate lines where another textual variant was known to the person who wrote the umlauts. Therefore, the distigmai mark places of textual uncertainty.
The same distigmai were observed in Codex Fuldensis, especially in the section containing 1 Cor 14:34–35. The distigme of two codices indicate a variant of the Western manuscripts, which placed 1 Cor 14:34–35 after 1 Cor 14:40 (manuscripts: Claromontanus, Augiensis, Boernerianus, 88, it, and some manuscripts of Vulgate).

On page 1512, next to Hebrews 1:3, the text contains a marginal note, "Fool and knave, leave the old reading and do not change it!" – "" which may suggest unauthorised correcting was a recognized problem in scriptoriums.

In the Vatican Library 

The manuscript is believed to have been housed in Caesarea in the 6th century, together with Codex Sinaiticus, as they have the same unique division of chapters in Acts. It came to Italy, probably from Constantinople, after the Council of Florence (1438–1445).

The manuscript has been housed in the Vatican Library (founded by Pope Nicholas V in 1448) for as long as it has been known, possibly appearing in the library's earliest catalog of 1475 (with shelf number 1209), but definitely appearing in the 1481 catalog. In the catalog from 1481 it was described as a "Biblia in tribus columnis ex membranis in rubeo" (three-column vellum Bible).

Collations 
In the 16th century Western scholars became aware of the manuscript as a consequence of the correspondence between Erasmus and the prefects of the Vatican Library, successively Paulus Bombasius, and Juan Ginés de Sepúlveda. In 1521, Bombasius was consulted by Erasmus as to whether the Codex Vaticanus contained the Comma Johanneum, and Bombasius supplied a transcript of 1 John 4:1–3 and 1 John 5:7–11 to show that it did not. Sepúlveda in 1533 cross-checked all places where Erasmus's New Testament (the Textus Receptus) differed from the Vulgate, and supplied Erasmus with 365 readings where the Codex Vaticanus supported the latter, although the list of these 365 readings has been lost. Consequently, the Codex Vaticanus acquired the reputation of being an old Greek manuscript that agreed with the Vulgate rather than with the Textus Receptus. Not until much later would scholars realise it conformed to a text that differed from both the Vulgate and the Textus Receptus – a text that could also be found in other known early Greek manuscripts, such as the Codex Regius (L), housed in the French Royal Library (now Bibliothèque nationale de France).

In 1669 a collation was made by Giulio Bartolocci, librarian of the Vatican, which was not published, and never used until Scholz in 1819 found a copy of it in the Royal Library at Paris. This collation was imperfect and revised in 1862. Another collation was made in 1720 for Bentley by Mico, revised by Rulotta, although not published until 1799. Bentley was stirred by Mill's claim of 30,000 variants in the New Testament and he wanted to reconstruct the text of the New Testament in its early form. He felt that among the manuscripts of the New Testament, Codex Alexandrinus was "the oldest and best in the world". Bentley understood the necessity to use manuscripts if he were to reconstruct an older form than that apparent in Codex Alexandrinus. He assumed, that by supplementing this manuscript with readings from other Greek manuscripts, and from the Latin Vulgate, he could triangulate back to the single recension which he presumed existed at the time of the First Council of Nicaea. Therefore, he required a collation from Vaticanus. Unfortunately, the text of the collation was irreconcilable with Codex Alexandrinus and he abandoned the project.

A further collation was made by Andrew Birch, who in 1798 in Copenhagen edited some textual variants of the Acts of the Apostles and the Epistles, in 1800 for the Book of Revelation, in 1801 for the Gospels. They were incomplete and included together with the textual variants from the other manuscripts. Many of them were false. Andrew Birch reproached Mill and Wettstein, that they falso citatur Vaticanus (cite Vaticanus incorrectly), and gave as an example Luke 2:38 – Ισραηλ [Israel] instead of Ιερουσαλημ [Jerusalem]. The reading Ισραηλ could be found in the codex 130, housed at the Vatican Library, under shelf number Vat. gr. 359.

Before the 19th century, no scholar was allowed to study or edit the Codex Vaticanus, and scholars did not ascribe any value to it; in fact, it was suspected to have been interpolated by the Latin textual tradition. John Mill wrote in his Prolegomena (1707): "in Occidentalium gratiam a Latino scriba exaratum" (written by a Latin scribe for the western world). He did not believe there was value to having a collation for the manuscript. Wettstein would have liked to know the readings of the codex, but not because he thought that they could have been of any help to him for difficult textual decisions. According to him, this codex had no authority whatsoever (sed ut vel hoc constaret, Codicem nullus esse auctoris). In 1751 Wettstein produced the first list of the New Testament manuscripts, Codex Vaticanus received symbol B (because of its age) and took second position on this list (Alexandrinus received A, Ephraemi – C, Bezae – D, etc.) until the discovery of Codex Sinaiticus (designated by ℵ).

Griesbach produced a list of nine manuscripts which were to be assigned to the Alexandrian text: C, L, K, 1, 13, 33, 69, 106, and 118. Codex Vaticanus was not in this list. In the second (1796) edition of his Greek NT, Griesbach added Codex Vaticanus as a witness to the Alexandrian text in Mark, Luke, and John. He still believed the first half of Matthew represented the Western text-type.

Editions of text of the codex 

In 1809 Napoleon brought the manuscript as a victory trophy to Paris, but in 1815 it was returned to the Vatican Library. During that time, German scholar Johann Leonhard Hug (1765–1846) saw it in Paris. Together with other worthy treasures of the Vatican, Hug examined it, but he did not perceive the need of a new and full collation.

Cardinal Angelo Mai prepared the first typographical facsimile edition between 1828 and 1838, which did not appear until 1857, three years after his death, and which was considered unsatisfactory. It was issued in 5 volumes (1–4 volumes for the Old Testament, 5 volume for the New Testament). All lacunae of the Codex were supplemented. Lacunae in the Acts and Pauline epistles were supplemented from the codex Vaticanus 1761, the whole text of Revelation from Vaticanus 2066, and the text of Mark 16:8–20 from Vaticanus Palatinus 220. Verses not included by codex as Matthew 12:47; Mark 15:28; Luke 22:43–44; 23:17.34; John 5:3.4; 7:53–8:11; 1 Peter 5:3; 1 John 5:7 were supplemented from popular Greek printed editions. The number of errors was extraordinarily high, and also no attention was paid to distinguish readings of the first hand versus correctors. There was no detailed examination of the manuscript's characteristics. As a consequence, this edition was deemed inadequate for critical purposes. An improved edition was published in 1859, which became the source of Bultmann's 1860 NT.

In 1843 Tischendorf was permitted to make a facsimile of a few verses, in 1844 Eduard de Muralt saw it, and in 1845 S. P. Tregelles was allowed to observe several points which Muralt had overlooked. He often saw the Codex, but "it was under such restrictions that it was impossible to do more than examine particular readings."
"They would not let me open it without searching my pockets, and depriving me of pen, ink, and paper; and at the same time two prelati kept me in constant conversation in Latin, and if I looked at a passage too long, they would snatch the book out of my hand".

Tregelles left Rome after five months without accomplishing his purpose. During a large part of the 19th century, the authorities of the Vatican Library obstructed scholars who wished to study the codex in detail. Henry Alford in 1849 wrote: “It has never been published in facsimile (!) nor even thoroughly collated (!!).” Scrivener in 1861 commented:
"Codex Vaticanus 1209 is probably the oldest large vellum manuscript in existence, and is the glory of the great Vatican Library in Rome. To these legitimate sources of deep interest must be added the almost romantic curiosity which has been excited by the jealous watchfulness of its official guardians, with whom an honest zeal for its safe preservation seems to have now degenerated into a species of capricious wilfulness, and who have shewn a strange incapacity for making themselves the proper use of a treasure they scarcely permit others more than to gaze upon". It (...) "is so jealously guarded by the Papal authorities that ordinary visitors see nothing of it but the red Morocco binding".

Thomas Law Montefiore (1862):
"The history of the Codex Vaticanus B, No. 1209, is the history in miniature of Romish jealousy and exclusiveness.” 
Burgon was permitted to examine the codex for an hour and a half in 1860, consulting 16 different passages. Burgon was a defender of the Traditional Text and for him Codex Vaticanus, as well as codices Sinaiticus and Bezae, were the most corrupt documents extant. He felt that each of these three codices "clearly exhibits a fabricated text – is the result of arbitrary and reckless recension." The two most widely respected of these three codices, א and B, he likens to the "two false witnesses" of Matthew 26:60.

In 1861, Henry Alford collated and verified doubtful passages (in several imperfect collations), which he published in facsimile editions complete with errors. Until he began his work he met unexpected hindrances. He received a special order from Cardinal Antonelli "per verificare", to verify passages, but this license was interpreted by the librarian to mean that he was to see the book, but not to use it. In 1862, secretary of Alford, Mr. Cure, continued Alford's work. For some reason which does not clearly appear, the authorities of the Vatican Library put continual obstacles in the way of all who wished to study it in detail, one of which was the Vatican Library was only opened for three hours a day. In 1867 Tischendorf published the text of the New Testament of the codex on the basis of Mai's edition. It was the "most perfect edition of the manuscript which had yet appeared".

In 1868–1881 C. Vercellone, Giuseppe Cozza-Luzi, and G. Sergio published an edition of the entire codex in 6 volumes (New Testament in volume V; Prolegomena in volume VI). A typographical facsimile appeared between 1868 and 1872. In 1889–1890 a photographic facsimile of the entire manuscript was made and published by Cozza-Luzi, in three volumes. Another facsimile of the New Testament text was published in 1904–1907 in Milan. As a result, the Codex became widely available.

In 1999, the Istituto Poligrafico e Zecca dello Stato in Rome (the Italian State Printing House and Mint) published a limited edition, full-color, exact scale facsimile of Codex Vaticanus. The facsimile reproduces the very form of the pages of the original manuscript, complete with the distinctive individual shape of each page, including holes in the vellum. It has an additional Prolegomena volume with gold and silver impressions of 74 pages.

, a digitised copy of the codex is available online from the Vatican Library.

Importance 

Codex Vaticanus is one of the most important manuscripts for the text of the Septuagint and Greek New Testament. It is a leading example of the Alexandrian text-type. It was used by Westcott and Hort in their edition, The New Testament in the Original Greek (1881), and it was the basis for their text. All critical editions of the New Testament published after Westcott and Hort were closer in the Gospels to the Codex Vaticanus text than to the Sinaiticus, with only the exception of Hermann von Soden's editions which are closer to Sinaiticus. All editions of Nestle-Aland remain close in textual character to the text of Westcott-Hort.

According to the commonly accepted opinion of the textual critics, it is the most important witness of the text of the Gospels, in the Acts and Catholic epistles, with a stature equal to Codex Sinaiticus, although in the Pauline epistles it includes Western readings and the value of the text is somewhat less than the Codex Sinaiticus. Unfortunately the manuscript is not complete. Aland notes: "B is by far the most significant of the uncials".

See also 
 List of New Testament uncials
 Biblical manuscript
 Textual criticism
 Minuscule 2427
 Differences between codices Sinaiticus and Vaticanus
 Fifty Bibles of Constantine

Notes

References

Cited books

Further reading

Facsimile editions of the codex

Textual character of the codex

Distigmai

Other 

For more bibliographies see: J. K. Elliott, A Bibliography of Greek New Testament Manuscripts (Cambridge University Press: 1989), pp. 34–36.

External links 

 Digitised copy 
 Codex Vaticanus Graecus 1209 Biblioteca Apostolica Vaticana.

 Typographical facsimile (1868) 
 Center for the Study of NT Manuscripts. Codex Vaticanus

 Documenta Catholica Omnia 
 Recensio Codice Vaticano – Documenta Catholica Omnia (2006)
 Old Testament Greek (LXX) Text Codex Vaticanus. Cambridge University Press 8vols, Brooke McLean 1906–1935.

 Articles 

 Universität Bremen Detailed description of "Codex Vaticanus" with many images and discussion of the "umlauts".
 Der "Codex Vaticanus" – ("B") EFG Berlin Hohenstaufenstr (2006) 

4th-century biblical manuscripts
Vaticanus
Vaticanus
Illuminated biblical manuscripts
Manuscripts of the Vatican Library
Septuagint manuscripts